A quasi-triangulation is a subdivision of a geometric object into simplices, where vertices are not points but arbitrary sloped line segments. This division is not a triangulation in the geometric sense.  It is a topological triangulation, however. A quasi-triangulation may have some of the characteristics of a Delaunay triangulation.

References 

Triangulation (geometry)